Noel Sands (born 1968) is an Irish former hurler who played as a left wing-forward for the Down senior team.

After making his first appearance for the team during the 1985-86 National League, Sands later became a regular member of the starting fifteen until his retirement prior to the 2003 National League. During that time he won three Ulster medals and was a three-time All-Star nominee.

At club level Sands is an eight-time county club championship medalist. Sands son Eoghan was part of the Down Minor Hurling team that won the Ulster Minor Hurling Championship and League in 2012.

Honours
 Down Senior Hurling Championship (8): 1988 1989 1991 1996 2000 2001 2002 2006
 Ulster Senior Hurling Championship (3): 1992 (C) 1995 1997
 National Hurling League Division 3 (2): 1987 1989
 Antrim Senior Hurling League (2) 2002 2003

References

 

1968 births
Living people
Portaferry hurlers
Down inter-county hurlers
Ulster inter-provincial hurlers